The 49th United States Congress was a meeting of the legislative branch of the United States federal government, consisting of the United States Senate and the United States House of Representatives. It met in Washington, D.C. from March 4, 1885, to March 4, 1887, during the first two years of Grover Cleveland's first presidency. The apportionment of seats in the House of Representatives was based on the 1880 United States census. The Senate had a Republican majority, and the House had a Democratic majority.

Major events
 

 March 4, 1885: Grover Cleveland became President of the United States
 November 25, 1885: Vice President Thomas A. Hendricks died

Major legislation

 January 19, 1886: Presidential Succession Act of 1886, ch. 4, 
 February 3, 1887: Electoral Count Act, ch. 90, 
 February 4, 1887: Interstate Commerce Act, ch. 104, 
 February 8, 1887: Indian General Allotment Act ("Dawes Act"), ch. 119, 
 March 2, 1887: Agricultural Experiment Stations Act of 1887
 March 2, 1887: Hatch Act of 1887, ch. 314, 
 March 3, 1887: Tucker Act, ch. 359, 
 March 3, 1887: Edmunds–Tucker Act, ch. 397

Party summary
The count below identifies party affiliations at the beginning of the first session of this Congress, and includes members from vacancies and newly admitted states, when they were first seated. Changes resulting from subsequent replacements are shown below in the "Changes in membership" section.

Senate

House of Representatives

Leadership

Senate
President:  Thomas A. Hendricks (D), until November 25, 1885; vacant thereafter
President pro tempore: John Sherman (R), December 7, 1885 – February 26, 1887 
 John J. Ingalls (R), from February 26, 1887
 Republican Conference Chairman: George F. Edmunds
 Democratic Caucus Chairman: James B. Beck
 Democratic Campaign Committee Chairman: Arthur Pue Gorman

House of Representatives
Speaker: John G. Carlisle (D)
Minority Leader: Thomas B. Reed
 Democratic Caucus Chairman: John Randolph Tucker
 Republican Conference Chairman: Joseph Gurney Cannon

Members

Senate
Senators were elected by the state legislatures every two years, with one-third beginning new six-year terms with each Congress.  Preceding the names in the list below are Senate class numbers, which indicate the cycle of their election.  In this Congress, Class 1 meant their term ended with this Congress, requiring reelection in 1886; Class 2 meant their term began in the last Congress, requiring reelection in 1888; and Class 3 meant their term began in this Congress, requiring reelection in 1890.

Alabama 
 2. John T. Morgan (D)
 3. James L. Pugh (D)

Arkansas 
 2. Augustus H. Garland (D), until March 6, 1885
 James H. Berry (D), from March 20, 1885
 3. James K. Jones (D)

California 
 1. John F. Miller (R), until March 8, 1886
 George Hearst (D), March 23 – August 4, 1886
 Abram P. Williams (R), from August 4, 1886
 3. Leland Stanford (R)

Colorado 
 2. Thomas M. Bowen (R)
 3. Henry M. Teller (R)

Connecticut 
 1. Joseph R. Hawley (R)
 3. Orville H. Platt (R)

Delaware 
 1. Thomas F. Bayard (D), until March 6, 1885
 George Gray (D), from March 18, 1885
 2. Eli M. Saulsbury (D)

Florida 
 1. Charles W. Jones (D)
 3. Wilkinson Call (D)

Georgia 
 2. Alfred H. Colquitt (D)
 3. Joseph E. Brown (D)

Illinois 
 2. Shelby M. Cullom (R)
 3. John A. Logan (R), May 19, 1885 – December 26, 1886
 Charles B. Farwell (R), from January 19, 1887

Indiana 
 1. Benjamin Harrison (R)
 3. Daniel W. Voorhees (D)

Iowa 
 2. James F. Wilson (R)
 3. William B. Allison (R)

Kansas 
 2. Preston B. Plumb (R)
 3. John J. Ingalls (R)

Kentucky 
 2. James B. Beck (D)
 3. Joseph C. S. Blackburn (D)

Louisiana 
 2. Randall L. Gibson (D)
 3. James B. Eustis (D)

Maine 
 1. Eugene Hale (R)
 2. William P. Frye (R)

Maryland 
 1. Arthur Pue Gorman (D)
 3. Ephraim K. Wilson (D)

Massachusetts 
 1. Henry L. Dawes (R)
 2. George F. Hoar (R)

Michigan 
 1. Omar D. Conger (R)
 2. Thomas W. Palmer (R)

Minnesota 
 1. Samuel J. R. McMillan (R)
 2. Dwight M. Sabin (R)

Mississippi 
 1. James Z. George (D)
 2. Lucius Q. C. Lamar (D), until March 6, 1885
 Edward C. Walthall (D), from March 9, 1885

Missouri 
 1. Francis M. Cockrell (D)
 3. George G. Vest (D)

Nebraska 
 1. Charles H. Van Wyck (R)
 2. Charles F. Manderson (R)

Nevada 
 1. James G. Fair (D)
 3. John P. Jones (R)

New Hampshire 
 2. Austin F. Pike (R), until October 8, 1886
 Person C. Cheney (R), from November 24, 1886
 3. Henry W. Blair (R), from March 5, 1885

New Jersey 
 1. William J. Sewell (R)
 2. John R. McPherson (D)

New York 
 1. Warner Miller (R)
 3. William M. Evarts (R)

North Carolina 
 2. Matt W. Ransom (D)
 3. Zebulon B. Vance (D)

Ohio 
 1. John Sherman (R)
 3. Henry B. Payne (D)

Oregon 
 2. Joseph N. Dolph (R)
 3. John H. Mitchell (R), from November 18, 1885

Pennsylvania 
 1. John I. Mitchell (R)
 3. J. Donald Cameron (R)

Rhode Island 
 1. Nelson W. Aldrich (R)
 2. Jonathan Chace (R)

South Carolina 
 2. Matthew C. Butler (D)
 3. Wade Hampton (D)

Tennessee 
 1. Howell E. Jackson (D), until April 14, 1886
 Washington C. Whitthorne (D), from April 16, 1886
 2. Isham G. Harris (D)

Texas 
 1. Samuel B. Maxey (D)
 2. Richard Coke (D)

Vermont 
 1. George F. Edmunds (R)
 3. Justin S. Morrill (R)

Virginia 
 1. William Mahone (RA)
 2. Harrison H. Riddleberger (RA)

West Virginia 
 1. Johnson N. Camden (D)
 2. John E. Kenna (D)

Wisconsin 
 1. Philetus Sawyer (R)
 3. John C. Spooner (R)

House of Representatives
The names of members of the House of Representatives are listed by district.

Alabama 
 . James T. Jones (D)
 . Hilary A. Herbert (D)
 . William C. Oates (D)
 . Alexander C. Davidson (D)
 . Thomas W. Sadler (D)
 . John M. Martin (D)
 . William H. Forney (D)
 . Joseph Wheeler (D)

Arkansas 
 . Poindexter Dunn (D)
 . Clifton R. Breckinridge (D)
 . Thomas C. McRae (D), from December 7, 1885
 . John H. Rogers (D)
 . Samuel W. Peel (D)

California 
 . Barclay Henley (D)
 . James A. Louttit (R)
 . Joseph McKenna (R)
 . William W. Morrow (R)
 . Charles N. Felton (R)
 . Henry H. Markham (R)

Colorado 
 . George G. Symes (R)

Connecticut 
 . John R. Buck (R)
 . Charles L. Mitchell (D)
 . John T. Wait (R)
 . Edward W. Seymour (D)

Delaware 
 . Charles B. Lore (D)

Florida 
 . Robert H. M. Davidson (D)
 . Charles Dougherty (D)

Georgia 
 . Thomas M. Norwood (D)
 . Henry G. Turner (D)
 . Charles F. Crisp (D)
 . Henry R. Harris (D)
 . Nathaniel J. Hammond (D)
 . James H. Blount (D)
 . Judson C. Clements (D)
 . Seaborn Reese (D)
 . Allen D. Candler (D)
 . George T. Barnes (D)

Illinois 
 . Ransom W. Dunham (R)
 . Frank Lawler (D)
 . James H. Ward (D)
 . George E. Adams (R)
 . Reuben Ellwood (R), until July 1, 1885
 Albert J. Hopkins (R), from December 7, 1885
 . Robert R. Hitt (R)
 . Thomas J. Henderson (R)
 . Ralph Plumb (R)
 . Lewis E. Payson (R)
 . Nicholas E. Worthington (D)
 . William H. Neece (D)
 . James M. Riggs (D)
 . William M. Springer (D)
 . Jonathan H. Rowell (R)
 . Joseph G. Cannon (R)
 . Silas Z. Landes (D)
 . John R. Eden (D)
 . William R. Morrison (D)
 . Richard W. Townshend (D)
 . John R. Thomas (R)

Indiana 
 . John J. Kleiner (D)
 . Thomas R. Cobb (D)
 . Jonas G. Howard (D)
 . William S. Holman (D)
 . Courtland C. Matson (D)
 . Thomas M. Browne (R)
 . William D. Bynum (D)
 . James T. Johnston (R)
 . Thomas B. Ward (D)
 . William D. Owen (R)
 . George W. Steele (R)
 . Robert Lowry (D)
 . George Ford (D)

Iowa 
 . Benton J. Hall (D)
 . Jeremiah H. Murphy (D)
 . David B. Henderson (R)
 . William E. Fuller (R)
 . Benjamin T. Frederick (D)
 . James B. Weaver (GB)
 . Edwin H. Conger (R)
 . William P. Hepburn (R)
 . Joseph Lyman (R)
 . Adoniram J. Holmes (R)
 . Isaac S. Struble (R)

Kansas 
 . Edmund N. Morrill (R)
 . Edward H. Funston (R)
 . Bishop W. Perkins (R)
 . Thomas Ryan (R)
 . John A. Anderson (R)
 . Lewis Hanback (R)
 . Samuel R. Peters (R)

Kentucky 
 . William J. Stone (D)
 . Polk Laffoon (D)
 . John E. Halsell (D)
 . Thomas A. Robertson (D)
 . Albert S. Willis (D)
 . John G. Carlisle (D)
 . William C. P. Breckinridge (D)
 . James B. McCreary (D)
 . William H. Wadsworth (R)
 . William P. Taulbee (D)
 . Frank L. Wolford (D)

Louisiana 
 . Louis St. Martin (D)
 . Michael Hahn (R), until March 15, 1886
 Nathaniel D. Wallace (D), from December 9, 1886
 . Edward J. Gay (D)
 . Newton C. Blanchard (D)
 . J. Floyd King (D)
 . Alfred B. Irion (D)

Maine 
 . Thomas B. Reed (R)
 . Nelson Dingley Jr. (R)
 . Seth L. Milliken (R)
 . Charles A. Boutelle (R)

Maryland 
 . Charles H. Gibson (D)
 . Frank T. Shaw (D)
 . William H. Cole (D), until July 8, 1886
 Henry W. Rusk (D), from November 2, 1886
 . John V. L. Findlay (D)
 . Barnes Compton (D)
 . Louis E. McComas (R)

Massachusetts 
 . Robert T. Davis (R)
 . John D. Long (R)
 . Ambrose A. Ranney (R)
 . Patrick A. Collins (D)
 . Edward D. Hayden (R)
 . Henry B. Lovering (D)
 . Eben F. Stone (R)
 . Charles H. Allen (R)
 . Frederick D. Ely (R)
 . William W. Rice (R)
 . William Whiting (R)
 . Francis W. Rockwell (R)

Michigan 
 . William C. Maybury (D)
 . Nathaniel B. Eldredge (D)
 . James O'Donnell (R)
 . Julius C. Burrows (R)
 . Charles C. Comstock (D)
 . Edwin B. Winans (D)
 . Ezra C. Carleton (D)
 . Timothy E. Tarsney (D)
 . Byron M. Cutcheon (R)
 . Spencer O. Fisher (D)
 . Seth C. Moffatt (R)

Minnesota 
 . Milo White (R)
 . James B. Wakefield (R)
 . Horace B. Strait (R)
 . John B. Gilfillan (R)
 . Knute Nelson (R)

Mississippi 
 . John M. Allen (D)
 . James B. Morgan (D)
 . Thomas C. Catchings (D)
 . Frederick G. Barry (D)
 . Otho R. Singleton (D)
 . Henry S. Van Eaton (D)
 . Ethelbert Barksdale (D)

Missouri 
 . William H. Hatch (D)
 . John B. Hale (D)
 . Alexander M. Dockery (D)
 . James N. Burnes (D)
 . William Warner (R)
 . John T. Heard (D)
 . John E. Hutton (D)
 . John J. O'Neill (D)
 . John M. Glover (D)
 . Martin L. Clardy (D)
 . Richard P. Bland (D)
 . William J. Stone (D)
 . William H. Wade (R)
 . William Dawson (D)

Nebraska 
 . Archibald J. Weaver (R)
 . James Laird (R)
 . George W. E. Dorsey (R)

Nevada 
 . William Woodburn (R)

New Hampshire 
 . Martin A. Haynes (R)
 . Jacob H. Gallinger (R)

New Jersey 
 . George Hires (R)
 . James Buchanan (R)
 . Robert S. Green (D), until January 17, 1887
 . James N. Pidcock (D)
 . William W. Phelps (R)
 . Herman Lehlbach (R)
 . William McAdoo (D)

New York 
 . Perry Belmont (D)
 . Felix Campbell (D)
 . Darwin R. James (R)
 . Peter P. Mahoney (D)
 . Archibald M. Bliss (D)
 . Nicholas Muller (D)
 . John J. Adams (D)
 . Samuel S. Cox (D), until May 20, 1885
 Timothy J. Campbell (D), from November 3, 1885
 . Joseph Pulitzer (D), until April 10, 1886
 Samuel S. Cox (D), from November 2, 1886
 . Abram S. Hewitt (D), until December 30, 1886
 . Truman A. Merriman (D)
 . Abraham Dowdney (D), until December 10, 1886
 . Egbert L. Viele (D)
 . William G. Stahlnecker (D)
 . Lewis Beach (D), until August 10, 1886
 Henry Bacon (D), from December 6, 1886
 . John H. Ketcham (R)
 . James G. Lindsley (R)
 . Henry G. Burleigh (R)
 . John Swinburne (R)
 . George West (R)
 . Frederick A. Johnson (R)
 . Abraham X. Parker (R)
 . John T. Spriggs (D)
 . John S. Pindar (D)
 . Frank Hiscock (R)
 . Stephen C. Millard (R)
 . Sereno E. Payne (R)
 . John Arnot Jr. (D), until November 20, 1886
 . Ira Davenport (R)
 . Charles S. Baker (R)
 . John G. Sawyer (R)
 . John M. Farquhar (R)
 . John B. Weber (R)
 . Walter L. Sessions (R)

North Carolina 
 . Thomas G. Skinner (D)
 . James E. O'Hara (R)
 . Wharton J. Green (D)
 . William Ruffin Cox (D)
 . James W. Reid (D), until December 31, 1886
 . Risden T. Bennett (D)
 . John S. Henderson (D)
 . William H. H. Cowles (D)
 . Thomas D. Johnston (D)

Ohio 
 . Benjamin Butterworth (R)
 . Charles E. Brown (R)
 . James E. Campbell (D)
 . Charles M. Anderson (D)
 . Benjamin Le Fevre (D)
 . William D. Hill (D)
 . George E. Seney (D)
 . John Little (R)
 . William C. Cooper (R)
 . Jacob Romeis (R)
 . William W. Ellsberry (D)
 . Albert C. Thompson (R)
 . Joseph H. Outhwaite (D)
 . Charles H. Grosvenor (R)
 . Beriah Wilkins (D)
 . George W. Geddes (D)
 . Adoniram J. Warner (D)
 . Isaac H. Taylor (R)
 . Ezra B. Taylor (R)
 . William McKinley (R)
 . Martin A. Foran (D)

Oregon 
 . Binger Hermann (R)

Pennsylvania 
 . Henry H. Bingham (R)
 . Charles O'Neill (R)
 . Samuel J. Randall (D)
 . William D. Kelley (R)
 . Alfred C. Harmer (R)
 . James B. Everhart (R)
 . I. Newton Evans (R)
 . Daniel Ermentrout (D)
 . John A. Hiestand (R)
 . William H. Sowden (D)
 . John B. Storm (D)
 . Joseph A. Scranton (R)
 . Charles N. Brumm (R)
 . Franklin Bound (R)
 . Frank C. Bunnell (R)
 . William W. Brown (R)
 . Jacob M. Campbell (R)
 . Louis E. Atkinson (R)
 . John A. Swope (D), from November 3, 1885
 . Andrew G. Curtin (D)
 . Charles E. Boyle (D)
 . James S. Negley (R)
 . Thomas M. Bayne (R)
 . Oscar L. Jackson (R)
 . Alexander C. White (R)
 . George W. Fleeger (R)
 . William L. Scott (D)
 . Edwin S. Osborne (R)

Rhode Island 
 . Henry J. Spooner (R)
 . William A. Pirce (R), until January 25, 1887
 Charles H. Page (D), from February 21, 1887

South Carolina 
 . Samuel Dibble (D)
 . George D. Tillman (D)
 . D. Wyatt Aiken (D)
 . William H. Perry (D)
 . John J. Hemphill (D)
 . George W. Dargan (D)
 . Robert Smalls (R)

Tennessee 
 . Augustus H. Pettibone (R)
 . Leonidas C. Houk (R)
 . John R. Neal (D)
 . Benton McMillin (D)
 . James D. Richardson (D)
 . Andrew J. Caldwell (D)
 . John G. Ballentine (D)
 . John M. Taylor (D)
 . Presley T. Glass (D)
 . Zachary Taylor (R)

Texas 
 . Charles Stewart (D)
 . John H. Reagan (D)
 . James H. Jones (D)
 . David B. Culberson (D)
 . James W. Throckmorton (D)
 . Olin Wellborn (D)
 . William H. Crain (D)
 . James F. Miller (D)
 . Roger Q. Mills (D)
 . Joseph D. Sayers (D)
 . Samuel W. T. Lanham (D)

Vermont 
 . John W. Stewart (R)
 . William W. Grout (R)

Virginia 
 . Thomas Croxton (D)
 . Harry Libbey (RA)
 . George D. Wise (D)
 . James D. Brady (R)
 . George Cabell (D)
 . John W. Daniel (D)
 . Charles T. O'Ferrall (D)
 . John S. Barbour Jr. (D)
 . Connally F. Trigg (D)
 . John R. Tucker (D)

West Virginia 
 . Nathan Goff (R)
 . William L. Wilson (D)
 . Charles P. Snyder (D)
 . Eustace Gibson (D)

Wisconsin 
 . Lucien B. Caswell (R)
 . Edward S. Bragg (D)
 . Robert M. La Follette (R)
 . Isaac W. Van Schaick (R)
 . Joseph Rankin (D), until January 24, 1886
 Thomas R. Hudd (D), from March 8, 1886
 . Richard W. Guenther (R)
 . Ormsby B. Thomas (R)
 . William T. Price (R), until December 6, 1886
 Hugh H. Price (R), from January 18, 1887
 . Isaac Stephenson (R)

Non-voting members 
 . Curtis C. Bean (R)
 . Oscar S. Gifford (R)
 . John Hailey (D)
 . Joseph Toole (D)
 . Antonio Joseph (D)
 . John T. Caine (D)
 . Charles S. Voorhees (D)
 . Joseph M. Carey (R)

Changes in membership
The count below reflects changes from the beginning of the first session of this Congress.

Senate 
 Replacements: 7
 Democratic: 1 seat net gain
 Republican: 1 seat net loss
 Liberal Republican: 1 seat net loss
 Deaths: 3
 Resignations: 6
 Interim appointments: 1
Total seats with changes: 9

House of Representatives 
 Replacements: 11
 Democratic: 2 seat net gain
 Republican: 2 seat net loss
 Deaths: 8
 Resignations: 7
 Contested election: 1
Total seats with changes: 16

Committees

Senate

 Additional Accommodations for the Library of Congress (Select) (Chairman: Daniel W. Voorhees; Ranking Member: Justin S. Morrill)
 Agriculture and Forestry (Chairman: Warner Miller; Ranking Member: James Z. George)
 Appropriations (Chairman: William B. Allison; Ranking Member: John A. Logan)
 Audit and Control the Contingent Expenses of the Senate (Chairman: John P. Jones; Ranking Member: Zebulon B. Vance)
 Civil Service and Retrenchment (Chairman: Joseph R. Hawley; Ranking Member: Daniel W. Voorhees)
 Claims (Chairman: Austin F. Pike; Ranking Member: Howell E. Jackson)
 Coast Defenses (Chairman: Joseph N. Dolph; Ranking Member: Samuel B. Maxey)
 Commerce (Chairman: Samuel J.R. McMillan; Ranking Member: Matt W. Ransom)
 Compensation of Members of Congress (Select)
 Distributing Public Revenue Among the States (Select)
 District of Columbia (Chairman: John J. Ingalls; Ranking Member: Isham G. Harris)
 Education and Labor (Chairman: Henry W. Blair; Ranking Member: Wilkinson Call)
 Engrossed Bills (Chairman: Eli Saulsbury; Ranking Member: William B. Allison)
 Enrolled Bills (Chairman: Thomas M. Bowen; Ranking Member: Alfred H. Colquitt)
 Epidemic Diseases (Select) (Chairman: Isham G. Harris; Ranking Member: John C. Spooner)
 Examine the Several Branches in the Civil Service (Chairman: Dwight M. Sabin; Ranking Member: Wade Hampton)
 Executive Departments Methods (Select)
 Expenditures of Public Money (Chairman: Shelby M. Cullom; Ranking Member: James B. Beck)
 Finance (Chairman: Justin S. Morrill; Ranking Member: Daniel W. Voorhees)
 Fisheries (Chairman: Thomas W. Palmer; Ranking Member: John T. Morgan)
 Foreign Relations (Chairman: John Sherman; Ranking Member: John T. Morgan) 
 Indian Affairs (Chairman: Henry L. Dawes; Ranking Member: Samuel B. Maxey)
 Indian Traders (Select)
 Interstate Commerce (Select) (Chairman: Shelby M. Cullom; Ranking Member: N/A)
 Judiciary (Chairman: George F. Edmunds; Ranking Member: William M. Evarts)
 Library (Chairman: William J. Sewell; Ranking Member: Daniel W. Voorhees)
 Manufactures (Chairman: Harrison H. Riddleberger; Ranking Member: Alfred H. Colquitt)
 Military Affairs (Chairman: John A. Logan; Ranking Member: Charles F. Manderson)
 Mines and Mining (Chairman: Henry M. Teller; Ranking Member: Wade Hampton)
 Mississippi River and its Tributaries (Select) (Chairman: Charles H. Van Wyck; Ranking Member: Francis M. Cockrell)
 Naval Affairs (Chairman: J. Donald Cameron; Ranking Member: John R. McPherson)
 Nicaraguan Claims (Select) (Chairman: Samuel B. Maxey; Ranking Member: Benjamin Harrison)
 Ordnance and War Ships (Select) (Chairman: Joseph R. Hawley; Ranking Member: Johnson N. Camden)
 Patents (Chairman: J. Donald Cameron; Ranking Member: Johnson N. Camden)
 Pensions (Chairman: John I. Mitchell; Ranking Member: Howell E. Jackson)
 Post Office and Post Roads (Chairman: Omar D. Conger; Ranking Member: Samuel B. Maxey)
 Potomac River Front (Select)
 Printing (Chairman: Charles F. Manderson; Ranking Member: Arthur P. Gorman)
 Private Land Claims (Chairman: Matt W. Ransom; Ranking Member: George F. Edmunds)
 Privileges and Elections (Chairman: George F. Hoar; Ranking Member: Eli Saulsbury)
 Public Buildings and Grounds (Chairman: William Mahone; Ranking Member: John T. Morgan)
 Public Lands (Chairman: Preston B. Plumb; Ranking Member: John T. Morgan)
 Railroads (Chairman: Philetus Sawyer; Ranking Member: Joseph E. Brown)
 Revision of the Laws (Chairman: James F. Wilson; Ranking Member: John E. Kenna)
 Revolutionary Claims (Chairman: Charles W. Jones; Ranking Member: Samuel J.R. McMillan)
 Rules (Chairman: William P. Frye; Ranking Member: Isham G. Harris)
 Tariff Regulation (Select)
 Tenth Census (Select) (Chairman: Eugene Hale; Ranking Member: Richard Coke)
 Territories (Chairman: Benjamin Harrison; Ranking Member: Matthew C. Butler)
 Transportation Routes to the Seaboard (Chairman: Nelson W. Aldrich; Ranking Member: Randall L. Gibson)
 Whole
 Woman Suffrage (Select) (Chairman: Francis M. Cockrell; Ranking Member: Thomas W. Palmer)

House of Representatives

 Accounts (Chairman: John T. Spriggs; Ranking Member: George E. Adams)
 Admission to the Floor (Select)
 Agriculture (Chairman: William H. Hatch; Ranking Member: Presley T. Glass)
 Alcoholic Liquor Traffic (Select) (Chairman: James E. Campbell; Ranking Member: Truman A. Merriman)
 American Ship building (Select) (Chairman: Poindexter Dunn; Ranking Member: Charles C. Comstock)
 Appropriations (Chairman: Samuel J. Randall; Ranking Member: William L. Wilson)
 Banking and Currency (Chairman: James F. Miller; Ranking Member: John E. Hutton)
 Claims (Chairman: William M. Springer; Ranking Member: William H. Sowden)
 Coinage, Weights and Measures (Chairman: Richard P. Bland; Ranking Member: William D. Bynum)
 Commerce (Chairman: John H. Reagan; Ranking Member: Alfred B. Irion)
 District of Columbia (Chairman: John S. Barbour; Ranking Member: John T. Heard)
 Education (Chairman: D. Wyatt Aiken; Ranking Member: Peter P. Mahoney)
 Elections (Chairman: Henry G. Turner; Ranking Member: Benton J. Hall)
 Enrolled Bills (Chairman: William H. Neece; Ranking Member: Adoniram J. Holmes)
 Expenditures in the Interior Department (Chairman: James B. Weaver; Ranking Member: Charles N. Brumm)
 Expenditures in the Justice Department (Chairman: Eustace Gibson; Ranking Member: Seth L. Milliken)
 Expenditures in the Navy Department (Chairman: John M. Taylor; Ranking Member: Jonathan H. Rowell)
 Expenditures in the Post Office Department (Chairman: Seaborn Reese; Ranking Member: Zachary Taylor)
 Expenditures in the State Department (Chairman: Risden T. Bennett; Ranking Member: Joseph A. Scranton)
 Expenditures in the Treasury Department (Chairman: Robert Lowry; Ranking Member: Michael Hahn)
 Expenditures in the War Department (Chairman: Thomas A. Robertson; Ranking Member: Frederick A. Johnson)
 Expenditures on Public Buildings (Chairman: Lewis Beach; Ranking Member: Augustus H. Pettibone)
 Foreign Affairs (Chairman: Perry Belmont; Ranking Member: William H. Crain)
 Indian Affairs (Chairman: Olin Wellborn; Ranking Member: James H. Ward)
 Invalid Pensions (Chairman: Courtland C. Matson; Ranking Member: John S. Pindar)
 Judiciary (Chairman: John R. Tucker; Ranking Member: Risden T. Bennett) 
 Labor (Chairman: John J. O'Neill; Ranking Member: William H. Crain)
 Levees and Improvements of the Mississippi River (Chairman: J. Floyd King; Ranking Member: William Dawson)
 Manufactures (Chairman: George D. Wise; Ranking Member: John S. Pindar)
 Mileage (Chairman: John H. Rogers; Ranking Member: Ambrose A. Ranney)
 Military Affairs (Chairman: Edward S. Bragg; Ranking Member: Charles M. Anderson)
 Militia (Chairman: Nicholas Muller; Ranking Member: Barnes Compton)
 Mines and Mining (Chairman: Martin L. Clardy; Ranking Member: Frederick G. Barry)
 Naval Affairs (Chairman: Hilary A. Herbert; Ranking Member: Joseph D. Sayers)
 Pacific Railroads (Chairman: James W. Throckmorton; Ranking Member: James D. Richardson)
 Patents (Chairman: Charles L. Mitchell; Ranking Member: William H.H. Cowles)
 Pensions (Chairman: Nathaniel B. Eldredge; Ranking Member: John E. Hutton)
 Post Office and Post Roads (Chairman: James H. Blount; Ranking Member: Frederick G. Barry)
 Printing (Chairman: Ethelbert Barksdale; Ranking Member: John M. Farquhar)
 Private Land Claims (Chairman: John E. Halsell; Ranking Member: Robert S. Green)
 Public Buildings and Grounds (Chairman: Samuel Dibble; Ranking Member: Thomas D. Johnston)
 Public Lands (Chairman: Thomas R. Cobb; Ranking Member: Thomas Chipman McRae)
 Railways and Canals (Chairman: Robert H. M. Davidson; Ranking Member: James N. Pidcock)
 Revision of Laws (Chairman: William C. Oates; Ranking Member: John B. Hale)
 Rivers and Harbors (Chairman: Albert S. Willis; Ranking Member: John M. Glover)
 Rules (Chairman: John G. Carlisle; Ranking Member: Thomas B. Reed)
 Standards of Official Conduct
 Territories (Chairman: William D. Hill; Ranking Member: William Dawson)
 War Claims (Chairman: George W. Geddes; Ranking Member: James W. Reid)
 Ways and Means (Chairman: William R. Morrison; Ranking Member: William C.P. Breckinridge)
 Whole

Joint committees

 Conditions of Indian Tribes (Special)
 The Library (Chairman: Otho R. Singleton; Vice Chairman: Charles O'Neill)
 Printing
 Scientific Bureaus

Caucuses
 Democratic (House)
 Democratic (Senate)

Employees

Legislative branch agency directors
 Architect of the Capitol: Edward Clark
 Librarian of Congress: Ainsworth Rand Spofford 
 Public Printer of the United States: Sterling P. Rounds, until 1886 
 Thomas E. Benedict, starting 1886

Senate 
Secretary: Anson G. McCook
Librarian: George M. Weston
Sergeant at Arms: William P. Canady
Chaplain: Elias D. Huntley, Methodist, until March 15, 1886
 John G. Butler, Lutheran, elected March 15, 1886

House of Representatives 
Chaplain: John Summerfield Lindsay (Episcopalian), until December 7, 1885
 William H. Milburn (Methodist), elected December 7, 1885
Doorkeeper: Samuel Donelson, elected December 7, 1885
Clerk: John B. Clark Jr.
Clerk at the Speaker's Table: Nathaniel T. Crutchfield
Postmaster: Lycurgus Dalton
Reading Clerks: Thomas S. Pettit (D) and Neill S. Brown Jr. (R)
Sergeant at Arms: John P. Leedom

Notes

See also 
 1884 United States elections (elections leading to this Congress)
 1884 United States presidential election
 1884–85 United States Senate elections
 1884 United States House of Representatives elections
 1886 United States elections (elections during this Congress, leading to the next Congress)
 1886–87 United States Senate elections
 1886 United States House of Representatives elections

References

External links
Biographical Directory of the U.S. Congress 
U.S. House of Representatives: House History 
U.S. Senate: Statistics and Lists